The following is a partial list of the "C" codes for Medical Subject Headings (MeSH), as defined by the United States National Library of Medicine (NLM).

This list continues the information at List of MeSH codes (C10). Codes following these are found at List of MeSH codes (C12). For other MeSH codes, see List of MeSH codes.

The source for this content is the set of 2006 MeSH Trees from the NLM.

– eye diseases

– asthenopia

– conjunctival diseases
  – conjunctival neoplasms
  – conjunctivitis
  – conjunctivitis, allergic
  – conjunctivitis, bacterial
  – conjunctivitis, inclusion
  – ophthalmia neonatorum
  – trachoma
  – conjunctivitis, viral
  – conjunctivitis, acute hemorrhagic
  – keratoconjunctivitis
  – keratoconjunctivitis, infectious
  – keratoconjunctivitis sicca
  – Reactive arthritis
  – pterygium
  – xerophthalmia

– corneal diseases
  – corneal dystrophies, hereditary
  – Fuchs' endothelial dystrophy
  – corneal edema
  – corneal neovascularization
  – corneal opacity
  – arcus senilis
  – keratitis
  – acanthamoeba keratitis
  – corneal ulcer
  – keratitis, herpetic
  – keratitis, dendritic
  – keratoconjunctivitis
  – keratoconjunctivitis, infectious
  – keratoconjunctivitis sicca
  – keratoconus
  – trachoma

– eye abnormalities
  – aniridia
  – WAGR syndrome
  – anophthalmos
  – blepharophimosis
  – coloboma
  – ectopia lentis
  – hydrophthalmos
  – microphthalmos
  – retinal dysplasia

– eye diseases, hereditary
  – albinism
  – albinism, ocular
  – albinism, oculocutaneous
  – Hermansky–Pudlak syndrome
  – aniridia
  – WAGR syndrome
  – choroideremia
  – corneal dystrophies, hereditary
  – Fuchs' endothelial dystrophy
  – duane retraction syndrome
  – gyrate atrophy
  – optic atrophies, hereditary
  – optic atrophy, hereditary, leber
  – optic atrophy, autosomal dominant
  – Wolfram syndrome
  – retinal dysplasia
  – retinitis pigmentosa
  – Usher syndromes
  – Graves' ophthalmopathy

– eye hemorrhage
  – choroid hemorrhage
  – hyphema
  – retinal hemorrhage
  – vitreous hemorrhage

– eye infections
  – corneal ulcer
  – eye infections, bacterial
  – conjunctivitis, bacterial
  – conjunctivitis, inclusion
  – ophthalmia neonatorum
  – trachoma
  – hordeolum
  – keratoconjunctivitis, infectious
  – tuberculosis, ocular
  – uveitis, suppurative
  – endophthalmitis
  – panophthalmitis
  – eye infections, fungal
  – uveitis, suppurative
  – endophthalmitis
  – panophthalmitis
  – eye infections, parasitic
  – acanthamoeba keratitis
  – onchocerciasis, ocular
  – toxoplasmosis, ocular
  – eye infections, viral
  – conjunctivitis, viral
  – conjunctivitis, acute hemorrhagic
  – cytomegalovirus retinitis
  – herpes zoster ophthalmicus
  – keratitis, herpetic
  – keratitis, dendritic

– eye manifestations

– eye neoplasms
  – conjunctival neoplasms
  – eyelid neoplasms
  – orbital neoplasms
  – retinal neoplasms
  – retinoblastoma
  – uveal neoplasms
  – choroid neoplasms
  – iris neoplasms

– eyelid diseases
  – blepharitis
  – blepharophimosis
  – blepharoptosis
  – blepharospasm
  – chalazion
  – ectropion
  – entropion
  – eyelid neoplasms
  – hordeolum

– Lacrimal apparatus diseases
  – dacryocystitis
  – dry eye syndromes
  – keratoconjunctivitis sicca
  – Sjögren syndrome
  – xerophthalmia
  – lacrimal duct obstruction

– lens diseases
  – aphakia
  – aphakia, postcataract
  – cataract
  – lens subluxation
  – ectopia lentis

– ocular hypertension
  – glaucoma
  – glaucoma, angle-closure
  – glaucoma, neovascular
  – glaucoma, open-angle
  – hydrophthalmos

– ocular hypotension

– ocular motility disorders
  – Duane retraction syndrome
  – Miller Fisher syndrome
  – nystagmus, pathologic
  – nystagmus, congenital
  – oculomotor nerve diseases
  – Adie syndrome
  – ophthalmoplegia
  – ophthalmoplegia, chronic progressive external
  – supranuclear palsy, progressive
  – ophthalmoplegia, chronic progressive external
  – Kearns–Sayre syndrome
  – strabismus
  – esotropia
  – exotropia
  – Tolosa–Hunt syndrome

– optic nerve diseases
  – optic atrophy
  – optic atrophies, hereditary
  – optic atrophy, hereditary, leber
  – optic atrophy, autosomal dominant
  – wolfram syndrome
  – optic disk drusen
  – optic nerve injuries
  – optic nerve neoplasms
  – optic nerve glioma
  – optic neuritis
  – neuromyelitis optica
  – optic neuropathy, ischemic
  – papilledema

– orbital diseases
  – enophthalmos
  – exophthalmos
  – Graves' disease
  – Graves ophthalmopathy
  – granuloma, plasma cell, orbital
  – orbital neoplasms
  – retrobulbar hemorrhage

– pupil disorders
  – anisocoria
  – miosis
  – horner syndrome
  – mydriasis
  – tonic pupil
  – aide syndrome

– refractive errors
  – aniseikonia
  – anisometropia
  – astigmatism
  – hyperopia
  – myopia
  – myopia, degenerative
  – presbyopia

– retinal diseases
  – angioid streaks
  – diabetic retinopathy
  – epiretinal membrane
  – retinal artery occlusion
  – retinal degeneration
  – macular degeneration
  – macular edema, cystoid
  – retinal drusen
  – retinitis pigmentosa
  – kearns-sayer syndrome
  – usher syndromes
  – retinoschisis
  – retinal detachment
  – retinal dysplasia
  – retinal hemorrhage
  – retinal neoplasms
  – retinoblastoma
  – retinal neovascularization
  – retinal perforations
  – retinal vasculitis
  – retinal vein occlusion
  – retinitis
  – chorioretinitis
  – cytomegalovirus retinitis
  – retinal necrosis syndrome, acute
  – retinopathy of prematurity
  – vitreoretinopathy, proliferative

– scleral diseases
  – scleritis

– uveal diseases
  – choroid diseases
  – choroid hemorrhage
  – choroid neoplasms
  – choroidal neovascularization
  – choroideremia
  – choroiditis
  – chorioretinitis
  – pars planitis
  – gyrate atrophy
  – iris diseases
  – aniridia
  – WAGR syndrome
  – exfoliation syndrome
  – iridocyclitis
  – iris neoplasms
  – iritis
  – uveal neoplasms
  – choroid neoplasms
  – iris neoplasms
  – uveitis
  – panuveitis
  – ophthalmia, sympathetic
  – uveitis, anterior
  – behcet syndrome
  – iridocyclitis
  – iritis
  – uveitis, posterior
  – choroiditis
  – chorioretinitis
  – pars planitis
  – uveitis, intermediate
  – pars planitis
  – uveitis, suppurative
  – endophthalmitis
  – panophthalmitis
  – uveomeningoencephalitic syndrome

– vision disorders
  – amblyopia
  – blindness
  – amaurosis fugax
  – blindness, cortical
  – hemianopsia
  – color vision defects
  – diplopia
  – night blindness
  – photophobia
  – scotoma
  – vision, low

– vitreoretinopathy, proliferative

– vitreous detachment

The list continues at List of MeSH codes (C12).

C11